Garnett is a surname. Notable people with the surname include:

 A.Y.P. Garnett (1820–1888), American physician
 Alvester Garnett (born 1970), American jazz drummer
 Amaryllis Garnett (1943–1973), English actress
 Amy Garnett (born 1976), English rugby union player 
 Angelica Garnett (1918–2012), English writer and painter
 Arthur William Garnett (1829–1861), English military and civil engineer
 Bill Garnett (born 1960), American basketball player
 Blind Leroy Garnett (1897–1933), American boogie-woogie and ragtime pianist and songwriter
 Bret Garnett (born 1967), American tennis player
 Carlos Garnett (born 1938), Panamanian-American jazz saxophonist
 Christopher Garnett, British railway executive
 Constance Garnett (1861–1946), English translator
 Dave Garnett (born 1970), American football player
 David Garnett (1892–1981), British writer and publisher
 David S. Garnett (born 1947), British science fiction writer
 Edward Garnett (1868–1937), British writer, critic and editor
 Edward Garnett (cricketer) (born 1965), English cricketer
 Eve Garnett (1900–1991), English author and illustrator
 Gale Garnett (born 1942), New Zealand-born Canadian folk singer
 Gwynn Garnett (1909-1995), Director of the U.S. Foreign Agricultural Service
 Harold Garnett (1879–1917), English-born cricketer who played for Lancashire and Argentina
 Harry Garnett (1851–1928), British rugby player
 Henrietta Garnett (1945–2019), English writer 
 Henry Garnet or Garnett (1555–1606), English Jesuit priest, executed for complicity in the Gunpowder Plot
 Sir Ian Garnett (born 1944), Royal Navy admiral
 James Clerk Maxwell Garnett (1880–1958), English educationist, barrister, and peace campaigner
 James M. Garnett (1770–1843), American politician from Virginia
 Jeremiah Garnett (1793–1870), English journalist
 John Garnett (bishop) (1707/8–1782), English priest, bishop of Clogher, Ireland
 John B. Garnett (born 1940), American mathematician
 Joy Garnett (born 1965), American artist
 Kevin Garnett (born 1976), American basketball player
 Lucy Garnett (1849–1934), British folklorist and traveller
 Marlon Garnett (born 1975), Belizean basketball player
 Merrill Garnett (born 1931), American biochemist and cancer researcher
 Michael Garnett (born 1982), Canadian ice hockey player
 Muscoe Russell Hunter Garnett (1821–1864), American politician from Virginia
 Nick Garnett (born 1964), English journalist and broadcaster
 Nicole Stelle Garnett (born 1970), American law professor
 Richard Garnett (philologist) (1789–1850), English philologist, author and librarian at the British Museum
 Richard Garnett (writer) (1835–1906), English scholar, librarian, biographer and poet
 Richard B. Garnett (1817–1863), Confederate general in American Civil War
 Richard W. Garnett (born 1968), American legal scholar
 Robert S. Garnett (congressman) (1789–1840), American politician and lawyer 
 Robert S. Garnett (1819–1861), Confederate officer in American Civil War
 Ruby Nash Garnett (born 1939), American singer 
 Sarah Garnett, New Zealand hockey umpire
 Shaun Garnett (born 1969), English football player
 Tay Garnett (1894–1977), American film director
 Thomas Garnet or Garnett (1575–1608), English Jesuit priest and martyr, declared a saint in 1970
 Thomas Garnett (disambiguation), multiple people
 Tommy Garnett (1915–2006), Australian headmaster, ornithologist and horticulturist
 Tony Garnett (1936–2020), British film producer
 William Garnett (civil servant) (1793–1873), British inspector-general of stamps and taxes who took a leading part in the introduction of income tax in Britain
 William Garnett (politician) (1818–1873), British politician
 William Garnett (photographer) (1916–2006), American photographer
 Winfield Garnett (born 1976), American football player

Fictional characters:
 Alf Garnett, character in 20th century BBC television sitcoms

See also
Garnet (name)